Otho James Nitcholas (September 13, 1908 – September 11, 1986) was a Major League Baseball pitcher who appeared in seven games, all in relief, for the Brooklyn Dodgers in 1945.

Nitcholas is one of many ballplayers who only appeared in the major leagues during World War II. He made his major league debut on April 18, 1945 against the Philadelphia Phillies at Ebbets Field. His lone major league win came eighteen days later in a 10–7 victory over the Phillies in the second game of a doubleheader at Shibe Park.

Season and career totals for 7 games include a 1–0 record, 3 games finished, and an ERA of 5.30 in 18 innings pitched. Nitcholas walked one batter. He did give up four home runs during that span.

Nitcholas was a manager in the minor leagues from 1950–52.

On January 1, 1957, Nitcholas was appointed the first Chief of Police in Plano, Texas.

Nitcholas died in his hometown of McKinney, Texas, in 1986.

External links 
 or Retrosheet

Major League Baseball pitchers
Baseball players from Texas
Brooklyn Dodgers players
People from McKinney, Texas
1908 births
1986 deaths
Minor league baseball managers
Fort Wayne Chiefs players
Shreveport Sports players
Tyler Sports players
Baton Rouge Senators players
Oklahoma City Indians players
Sacramento Senators players
Mission Reds players
Hollywood Stars players
Fort Worth Cats players
Dallas Rebels players
St. Paul Saints (AA) players
Tyler Trojans players
Dallas Eagles players
Gladewater Bears players
Alexandria Aces players
Abilene Blue Sox players
Brownsville Charros players